American International University-Bangladesh, commonly known by its acronym AIUB, is an accredited and reputed private university in Dhaka, Bangladesh. The university is an independent organization with its own Board of Trustees. It offers several degree programs at both graduate and undergraduate level from four faculties, particularly in the fields of engineering and business studies. The university campus is known for having a glass-covered central globe structured building, that increases its beauty, and contains a vast library inside of it.

History
The university was established in 1994 as AMA International University Bangladesh, a joint venture between AMA Computer University of the Philippines, and local initiator Dr. Anwarul Abedin. Regular academic classes started in 1995. AMA Computer University later left the partnership, and in 2001 the university was renamed American International University-Bangladesh.

Campus

The university's campus is located in an urban setting at Kuratoli, Khilkhet in Dhaka. The university campus is considered as most beautifully designed compared to other private universities. AIUB places students, faculties & employees at its heart, creating an ideal green environment for continued creativity, innovation and wellbeing. The AIUB campus is open-architecture and connected to nature and the product of a remarkable collaboration. AIUB has 25 computer labs, 19 engineering labs, 10 design studios, 4 physics labs, 2 chemistry labs, and 1 language lab with 40 workstations in each and 24 servers to support the IT infrastructure. AIUB also has an International standard Moot Court to facilitate the overall clinical legal education. It also has State-of-the-art Auditorium and Multipurpose Hall, with built-in acoustics, world-class sound systems, P3 LED projection screens and a seating capacity of around 1000. There are various available facilities such as AIUB Daycare Facilities, Recreational Area, Cafeteria, student Lounge,  etc. for students.

Library 
The AIUB Library was started in 1994 in order to cater to the academic and research needs of the faculty, research scholars, students, and officers. Over the years, the Library has grown steadily and expanded its services and holdings by leaps and bounds to live-up to the expectations of its immediate patrons. The book stock is arranged in a classified sequence based on the Dewey Decimal System (DDC), and the great majority of volumes in the Library are on open shelves, available for borrowing. It also offers postgraduate degree.

Admission 
Each applicant has to pass the competitive admission test administered by the university. In admission test university judges applicant for their knowledge of math and English language. No IELTS score is acceptable without admission test, only TOEFL is acceptable. There are two parts of admission exam written and Viva. Student have to pass both individually.

List of vice-chancellors 
dr. carmen lamegna ( present )

Academics
The medium of instruction of all academic programs at AIUB is English. The academic year of the university incorporates two regular semesters (Fall and Spring). The Summer semester is an optional summer semester at AIUB. The duration of each regular semester is 17 weeks and 10 weeks for the optional summer semester. The academic year starts from Fall semester.

The academic programs are divided among the Faculty of Arts & Social Sciences, Faculty of Business Administration, Faculty of Engineering, and Faculty of Science and Information Technology. All the faculties offer both undergraduate and graduate level studies.

AIUB updated its grading system in February 2017 for the second time. The New Grading System will be applicable for those students who have enrolled in Spring 2016-17 and later. Old Grading system will still be applicable for students who have enrolled in Fall 2016-17 and before. The letter grades indicating the quality of course work completed with their corresponding grade points. Minimum CGPA requirement for graduation in any undergraduate and graduate program at AIUB is 2.50.

The scholarship program at AIUB is open for both incoming and continuing students with at least one year of residency. It covers full or partial tuition fee waiver. Incoming students qualify by passing the competitive examinations while weighted average CGPA for the previous year of 3.75 with no grade lower than B and no F, I, W, UW grades no disciplinary records.  The number of awards is dependent on the slots available. AIUB authority also provide financial aids for deserving students. AIUB also offers 100% scholarship for the son and daughter of Freedom Fighter (they should maintain CGPA 3.50).

Faculties and Programs 

 Faculty of Arts and Social Sciences (FASS).
 Bachelor of Arts in English
 Bachelor of Arts in Media and Mass Communication (MMC)
 Bachelor of Laws (LLB)
 Bachelor of Social Science in Economics
 Master of Public Health (MPH)
 Master of Development Studies (MDS)
 Faculty of Business Administration.
 Bachelor of Business Administration (BBA); Major in -
 Accounting
 Economics
 Finance
 Human Resource Management (HRM)
 International Business (IB)
 Investment Management (IM)
 Management
 Management Information Systems (MIS)
 Marketing
 Operations and Supply Chain Management (OSCM)
 Tourism and Hospitality Management (THM)
 Master of Business Administration (MBA); major in -
 Accounting
 Agri-business
 Economics
 Finance
 General Management (MGT)
 Human Resource Management (HRM)
 Management Information Systems (MIS)
 Marketing
 Operations and Supply Chain Management (OSCM)
 Tourism and Hospitality Management (THM)
 Executive Master of Business Administration (EMBA)
 Faculty of Engineering.
 Bachelor of Science in Electrical And Electronic Engineering (EEE)
 Bachelor of Science in Computer Engineering (CoE)
 Bachelor of Science in Industrial and Production Engineering (IPE)
 Bachelor of Architecture (BArch)
 Master of Engineering in Electrical and Electronic Engineering (MEEE)
 Master of Engineering in Telecommunications (MTel)
 Faculty of Science and Technology
 Bachelor of Science in Computer Science and Engineering (CSE)
 Master of Science in Computer Science (MSCS)

Research and publications
In the research arena, AIUB has internal academic journals: AIUB Journal of Science and Engineering (AJSE) and AIUB Journal of Business and Economics (AJBE),. Since the first publications in 2002, three issues per year are being published regularly. AJSE is now formally Scopus indexed journal. AIUB is also the first institute in Bangladesh to launch an online working paper series named AIUB Bus Econ Working Paper Series, which is collaborated with the RePEc and EconPapers.

Extra curricular activities
AIUB is one of the only eight universities from Bangladesh who have participated in the maximum level of ACM International Collegiate Programming Contest (ACM ICPC) commonly known as ACM ICPC World Final. In 2001, AIUB qualified for the world final through Wild Card by securing second place in ACM ICPC Kanpur Site regional. Office of Student Affairs (OSA) looks after the extra curricular activities of the student community through student organizations like:
AIUB Arts Club first organized "AIUB Arts Club presents 1st Inter Private University Art Exhibition- 2012" Unleashing Imagination at Dhaka Art Center.

 The first person from Bangladesh who got job at Google and the only Principal Engineer of Google Zahid Sabur is from AIUB. Also, the first person who got job at NASA as a scientist is an AIUBIAN (First among private universities).
 AIUB has successfully participated in NASA Robot Challenge consecutively 4 times and it is the first and only university in Bangladesh that participated in NASA Robot Challenge consecutively 4 times. 
 In 2014-15 students of AIUB made a mini-submarine that was able to capture deeper underwater than any other mini-submarine.
 Students from AIUB made a software called ‘3rd eye’ which has won the People's Choice Award in Microsoft imagine cup.
 AIUB was in the Top 3 in NASA Robot Challenge.

Notable people

Alumni 
 Zaheed Sabur [B.Sc. in CSE] - Distinguished Engineer, Director of Google
 Shakib Al Hasan [BBA] - cricket player of Bangladesh National Cricket Team
 Mohammad Mahmudullah Riyad [MBA]- captain, Bangladesh National T20 Cricket Team
 Taskin Ahmed [BBA] - cricket player of Bangladesh National Cricket Team
 Abul Hossain [EMBA] - three star ranked Lieutenant General of Bangladesh Army
 Tawsif Mahbub [B.Sc. in EEE] - Television Actor
 Sabbir Rahman [BBA]  - cricket player of Bangladesh National Cricket Team
 Minar Rahman [BA in MMC] - Bangladeshi singer
 Sabila Nur [BA in English] - TV model, actress

Faculty
Current or former faculty include:
 Dr. Carmen Z. Lamagna
 Ahmad Kaikaus
 Aupee Karim
 Saleh Uddin

Gallery

References

 Microsoft help AIUB have virtual class room
 AIUB Robotic Crew has qualified for the final round of Mars Society's University Rover Challenge (URC), USA.
 aiub-থেকে-পৃথিবীর-স্বনামধন্য

External links
 Official Website
 Official Website of Department of CS

 
Universities and colleges in Dhaka
Private universities in Bangladesh
Private engineering universities of Bangladesh
Architecture schools in Bangladesh
Engineering universities of Bangladesh
Technological institutes of Bangladesh
Universities of science and technology in Bangladesh
1994 establishments in Bangladesh
Educational institutions established in 1994